The 1988 Austrian Supercup was a football match that saw the 1987–88 Bundesliga champions Rapid Wien face off against 1987–88 Austrian Cup winners Kremser SC. It was the third straight Supercup appearance for Rapid Wien. The match was held on 16 July 1988 at the Sepp-Doll-Stadion in Krems an der Donau. Rapid Wien defended their title for the third year in succession.

Match details

See also
1987–88 Austrian Football Bundesliga
1987–88 Austrian Cup

Austrian Supercup